2017 is the 58th season of the Professional Bowlers Association (PBA) Tour. The 2017 schedule includes 24 singles title events, two doubles title events, and one non-title team event (PBA League).

Tournament schedule and recaps

For the second year in a row, the PBA held three consecutive major tournaments in "Big February": The Barbasol PBA Players Championship, Fire Lake PBA Tournament of Champions, and the USBC Masters. The U.S. Open took place October 25 through November 1.

The season's final major, the PBA World Championship, was again part of the World Series of Bowling (WSOB), which took place November 7–19 at the National Bowling Stadium in Reno, Nevada. WSOB IX consisted of four "animal oil pattern" tournaments (Cheetah, Chameleon, Scorpion and Shark), each of which are standalone PBA title events while collectively serving as initial qualifying for the PBA World Championship. Total pinfall from the 40 games of animal pattern qualifying (10 games per tournament) determined the 49 bowlers for the Cashers Round of the World Championship. Cashers then bowled 20 more games (5 on each oil pattern) to determine the top five for the November 19 stepladder finals. 

In April, the PBA announced the first-ever Main Event PBA Finals, held May 18–20 in Orlando, Florida and broadcast for five consecutive Tuesdays on CBS Sports Network, starting May 30. This is an invitational event that serves as a type of bowling "playoffs", similar to The Chase for the Cup in NASCAR or the FedEx Cup in PGA golf. The event featured the top eight players in PBA Tour earnings, from the start of the 2015 season through this year's USBC Masters. Players were seeded 1–8 based on earnings, and split into Group 1 (1, 4, 5 and 8 seeds) and Group 2 (2, 3, 6 and 7 seeds). The groups bowled a mixed roundrobin match play session of four matches each, which made up the first two broadcasts. Players were then re-seeded within their groups, based on total pinfall plus a 50 pin bonus for every match win. Group 1 and Group 2 stepladder matches were held next, and were broadcast in the third and fourth weeks. The Group 1 and Group 2 winners then faced off in the fifth and final broadcast in a three-game, total pinfall head-to-head match to determine the PBA Finals champion.

For a second straight year, the PBA kept a rolling points list for all of the season's Xtra Frame tournaments (so designated because they are broadcast start-to-finish on the PBA's Xtra Frame subscription webcast service). Last season, a $10,000 winner-take-all bonus was awarded to the top points earner in the series. For 2017, the Xtra Frame series was renamed the XF PBA Tour Storm Cup, with Storm Bowling sponsoring an expanded award platform. The top points earner in 2017 won a $20,000 bonus, with additional payouts for second through fifth-place finishers ($10,000, $8,000, $7,000 and $5,000). Seven tour stops made up the Storm Cup series. Two additional tournaments (DHC PBA Japan Invitational and PBA-PWBA Striking Against Breast Cancer Mixed Doubles) were also covered exclusively by Xtra Frame, but did not qualify for Xtra Frame series points.

Highlights
 Jason Belmonte became the only player in PBA history to win three majors in a single season (PBA Players Championship, USBC Masters, PBA World Championship), as well as the only player to win the USBC Masters four times.
 With her win at the PBA Chameleon Championship in November, Liz Johnson became the second female bowler (after Kelly Kulick) to win an event on the national PBA Tour.

Season awards 
 Chris Schenkel PBA Player of the Year: Jason Belmonte
 Harry Golden PBA Rookie of the Year: Matt Sanders
 George Young High Average Award: Jason Belmonte (229.39)
 Steve Nagy Sportsmanship Award: Chris Loschetter
 Tony Reyes Community Service Award: Del Ballard Jr.

Tournament summary

Below is a current schedule of events for the 2017 PBA Tour season. Major tournaments are in bold. Career PBA title numbers for winners are shown in parenthesis.

C: broadcast on CBS Sports Network
E: broadcast on ESPN
X: broadcast on the PBA's Xtra Frame webcast service

References

External links
PBA 2017 Season Schedule
2017 PBA TV Schedule

Professional Bowlers Association seasons
2017 in bowling
Ten-pin bowling